The Chamber Wind Music of Jack Cooper is the first classical/new music studio recording featuring numerous performing artists recording chamber wind music of the composer on the Centaur Records label.

Background 
In 2006, it was decided a CD would be produced as a collaboration between Centaur Records and resources housed at the University of Memphis. Centaur Records agreed to have a CD completed for their label of either chamber wind works or chamber string/piano works; not a mix or both so to avoid a conflict in programming and marketing.  Artists were selected based on virtuoso musicianship and familiarity with the composer's work; being able to play both written and improvised passages at a high musical level.

Promotion and works from the compact disc 

Interviews were done in 2010 for WKNO-FM NPR Radio and WUMR Radio about the recording.  The works from the CD have been played and featured at numerous concert venues in North and South American (U.S., Canada, Brazil), primarily by the artists who commissioned each work.  The euphonium work One of the Missing was commissioned by John Mueller and is strong protest piece that both Cooper and Mueller felt very compelled to present in opposition to the Iraq War.    The recording of the Trombone Sonata (and manuscript) is one of the main subjects in a dissertation written in 2011 by Dr. Anthony Williams (music professor, University of Northern Iowa) on style and approach to four prominent 20th/21st Century solo trombone works: Alec Wilder - Sonata for Trombone and Piano, Richard Peaslee - Arrows of Time, William Goldstein - Colloquy for solo trombone, Jack Cooper - Sonata For Trombone.  The Trombone Sonata has also had a second prominent recording by trombone artist Mark Hetzler on his 2015 CD recording Blues, Ballads and Beyond with Summit Records.   All brass works (trombone, brass quintet, euphonium) from the recording are currently published with Brassworks 4 Publishing.  All three of the sonatas and the brass quintet from the recording have received reviews in international journals as prominent literature for saxophone, clarinet, trombone and brass ensemble.

Reception 

"...the purpose of this (recording) is to broaden the stylistic range of concert chamber music; a breaking-down of barriers...Collectors wishing to savor jazz served in classical mugs will find this an interesting release."

Ronald E. Grames, Fanfare Magazine

"Most enjoyable...are the two woodwind sonatas...The outer movements are lively and full of improvisatory exuberence, the (slow movement) allows (Paul) Haar to show his contemplative side.  In the Clarinet Sonata, Cedric Mayfield's high-register tone is never shrill, and his playing is impressive in both noted and improvised music."

Barry Kilpatrick, American Record Guide

"...of all of the compositions on this CD I most enjoyed One of the Missing (for those lost in Iraq), is soulfully performed by John Mueller on euphonium. To me, it had the most musical depth and expressive qualities."

Calvin Smith, The Horn Call

"...an engaging musical experience in the hands of these performers, who are stylistically so attuned to this music and so in command of their instruments."

William Nichols, ICA Journal/The Clarinet

"...Haar's recording of this piece on The Chamber Wind Music of Jack Cooper (Centaur Records) is very impressive and would be a great example for any younger player learning the piece."

David Demsey, Saxophone Journal

"The playing of all involved is terrific (check out Luis Bonilla on the Sonata for Trombone), and the music is accessible but different. If you would like to hear some contemporary wind chamber music with a good dose of jazz influence, then this CD fits the bill."

Roy Couch, ITEA Journal

Track listing

Recording sessions 
 November 13, 2007
 March 17, December 19, 2008
 March 9 and 17, June 2, 2009
 all tracks recorded in Harris Concert Hall, the University of Memphis School of Music

Personnel

Musicians 

 Composer, conductor: Jack Cooper
 Trombone: Luis Bonilla
 Alto Saxophone: Paul Haar
 Clarinet: Cedric Mayfield
 Trumpet: David Spencer
 Trumpet: Ben Lewis
 Horn: Daniel Phillips
 Trombone and Euphonium: John Mueller
 Tuba: Kevin Sanders
 Piano: Chris Parker
 Piano: Oksana Poleshook
 Latin Percussion: Pablo Bilbraut
 Drums (set): Michael Waldrop

Production 

 Recording engineer, mixing, and mastering: Jonathan Frazer
 Piano Technicians: Scott Higgins and Richard Boyington
 Liner Notes: Jack Cooper and Ken Kreitner
 Cover art: Cathy Cooper
 Photographer: Rene Koopman

See also
Luis Bonilla
Michael Waldrop
Sonata for Trombone (Cooper)
Works for saxophone and piano 
Clarinet sonata
Brass quintet repertoire
Euphonium repertoire

References

External links
 
 
 
  
 Centaur Records
 One Of The Missing ISWC T-906.284.681-5
 Sonata For Trombone ISWC T-906.282.236-0
 
 
 

2010 albums
2010 classical albums
Jazz albums by American artists
Chamber music albums